Jesús Daniel Chacón Martínez (born 8 June 2001) is a Venezuelan footballer who plays as a midfielder for LALA FC.

Career

Club career
Chacón is a product of Mineros de Guayana. In the summer 2017, he began training with Mineros' first team squad during the 2017 summer pre-season. He got his official debut for Mineros on 17 October 2018 in a game against Deportivo Lara in the Venezuelan Primera División.

In February 2019, Chacón joined fellow league club LALA FC.

References

External links
 

Living people
2001 births
Association football midfielders
Venezuelan footballers
Venezuelan Primera División players
A.C.C.D. Mineros de Guayana players
People from Ciudad Guayana
21st-century Venezuelan people